The 1990 United States Grand Prix was the opening motor race of the 1990 Formula One World Championship held on March 11, 1990, in Phoenix, Arizona. It was the 32nd United States Grand Prix since the American Grand Prize was first held in 1908, and the 25th under Formula One regulations since the first United States Grand Prix was held at Sebring, Florida in 1959. It was the second to be held on the streets of Phoenix and ran over 72 laps of the 4 km-circuit.

The race was won by Brazilian Ayrton Senna, driving a McLaren MP4/5B by eight seconds over French driver Jean Alesi in his comparatively under-funded Tyrrell 018. Throughout the race, the pair enthralled fans with some fabulous and daring passing for the lead.

It was Alesi's first podium finish, with Belgian driver Thierry Boutsen in a Williams FW13B coming home third.

Background
The United States Grand Prix in the dry desert city of Phoenix was moved to the start of the season in March to avoid the intense 100+ °F heat the city experiences in summer, although the previous year's race was run in June because it was given at such short notice. Swiss driver Gregor Foitek made his Formula One race debut for the Brabham team. He had attempted to qualify for races during the 1989 season, failing to make the grid in eleven qualifying attempts for EuroBrun and one for Rial.

Qualifying

Pre-qualifying report
Several teams were required to participate in the Friday morning pre-qualifying sessions during 1990, in order to reduce the field to thirty cars for the main qualifying sessions on Friday afternoon and Saturday. At the midway point of the season, the pre-qualifying group was to be reassessed, with the more successful, points-scoring teams being allowed to avoid pre-qualifying, and unsuccessful teams being required to pre-qualify from mid-season onwards.

Nine cars were required to take part in pre-qualifying sessions during the first half of the 1990 season, reduced from thirteen at the end of the 1989 season. The disappearance of the Zakspeed and Rial teams reduced the numbers, as did the reduction of the Osella and Coloni teams from two cars each to one car each. In contrast, EuroBrun expanded from one car to two, and were joined by the only new team on the entry lists, Life Racing Engines, who ran a single car. The fastest four cars would go through to the main qualifying sessions.

The Larrousse team again fielded Lola-Lamborghinis, driven by Éric Bernard and ex-Zakspeed driver Aguri Suzuki, both of whom had driven odd races for the team before. AGS continued with Yannick Dalmas and Gabriele Tarquini, while EuroBrun hired ex-Coloni driver Roberto Moreno and newcomer Claudio Langes. Coloni brought in ex-Rial and Onyx driver Bertrand Gachot to drive the C3B with its new Subaru-badged engine, while the sole Osella FA1M was to be driven by ex-Ligier man Olivier Grouillard. The new team, Life, hired another Grand Prix newcomer, Gary Brabham to drive their L190 car with its unusual W12 engine. The chassis had initially been built for the previous season by the First Racing team, which ultimately did not take part in Formula One.

During the pre-qualifying session on Friday morning, Moreno was fastest by four tenths of a second in his EuroBrun ER189B, already a great improvement over their form during 1989, despite the car being overweight. The Larrousse-Lola LC89Bs of Bernard and Suzuki were second and fourth, this marking the first pre-qualification for Suzuki after failing at every event for Zakspeed last season. Sandwiched between the Lolas in third was Grouillard in the Osella.

The unsuccessful runners included Tarquini and Dalmas in the two AGS JH24 cars, two seconds behind Suzuki, and debutant Langes in the second EuroBrun, a couple of seconds adrift of Dalmas. The other two cars struggled, as Brabham in the Life suffered electrical failure after four laps, the team having been unable to sufficiently test their new car and engine; while Gachot's Coloni broke a gear selector rod on its first lap.

Pre-qualifying classification

Qualifying report
Unexpected rain on Saturday meant that the grid was decided entirely by times from Friday's session. Pirelli's soft qualifying tires caught Goodyear off guard, and the Italian manufacturer put five of its teams in the top ten positions, including Jean Alesi, who was fourth in a Tyrrell. In a surprise move, team manager Ken Tyrrell had signed with Pirelli two days before the race, after 18 years with Goodyear. Gerhard Berger's pole-winning McLaren was the only car in the first two rows sporting Goodyears. Pierluigi Martini put Minardi on the front row for the only time in the team's history, less than seven-hundredths off Berger's pole time. In addition, Andrea de Cesaris (Scuderia Italia), Olivier Grouillard (Osella) and Roberto Moreno (EuroBrun) all scored what proved to be their team's best grid position of the year. Ayrton Senna could only manage fifth, while Alain Prost, in his first race for Ferrari, was seventh. Philippe Alliot was excluded when a mechanic worked on the car outside of the pit area during Friday's practice.

Qualifying classification

Race

Race report
Martin Donnelly did not take the dummy grid due to gearbox failure. (Some sources consider this a DNS.)

Race day was cool with a chance of rain.  Berger quickly pulled ahead of Martini and moved over in front of him, but Alesi, whose F1 career had begun in his home country of France the previous summer, made an even quicker start, passed them both and outbraked Berger into the first corner. He immediately began pulling away, and led by 2.4 seconds after one lap.

Senna passed de Cesaris for third, and closed on Berger, who was giving up a half second a lap to Alesi. The Brazilian got by his team-mate when, on lap 9, Berger hit a bump under braking, backed into the tire wall and damaged his rear wing. He pitted for a new wing, and later recorded the fastest lap of the race, but eventually retired with a clutch problem.

When Berger spun, Senna was 8.2 seconds behind Alesi. Not knowing whether the Tyrrell's Pirelli tires would last, Senna was reluctant to push too hard early on. After 30 laps, Alesi remained in the lead, but on lap 34, Senna passed him on the inside.  The Tyrrell held the outside line on the exit and retook the lead on the next turn.  At the same point, one lap later, Senna took the lead again, and this time he held it.

After several attempts to regain the lead, Alesi decided to conserve his tires, and let Senna go. Meanwhile, Nelson Piquet had progressed from sixth on the grid to third by lap 17. Brake trouble caused him to flatspot his tyres, however, and on lap 28 he pitted for new ones. This allowed Thierry Boutsen's Williams through, and though he battled a problem with his engine intermittently cutting out, he maintained third place to the flag. Piquet had to settle for fourth in his first drive for Benetton.

Prost had fallen back to ninth at the start with gearbox problems, and, while he advanced to fourth place by lap 17, his gearbox troubles proved terminal on lap 21. In the other Ferrari, Nigel Mansell retired from fifth on lap 49, when his clutch disintegrated and pierced the oil tank. The engine seized and caught fire, sending Mansell into a spin.

Senna built his lead over Alesi to 28.5 seconds, but backed off slightly when his engine began sounding less than healthy. Stefano Modena and Satoru Nakajima, in a Brabham and the second Tyrrell, respectively, finished the scoring in fifth and sixth places. It was the 21st win of Ayrton Senna's career and the first of six for the season. Alesi's podium finish was the first of his career.

The first two finishers were full of praise for one another after the race. Senna said he knew Alesi had the ingredients to be World Champion, and Alesi gushed, "He is my hero and has been for many years." Other winners in the race were Ken Tyrrell, with two cars in the points; and Pirelli, with three points finishers.

Race classification

Championship standings after the race

Drivers' Championship standings

Constructors' Championship standings

References

 Rob Walker (June, 1990). "2nd United States Grand Prix at Phoenix: Senna's Surprise". Road & Track, 92–96.

External links

United States Grand Prix
United States Grand Prix
Grand Prix
United States Grand Prix
History of Phoenix, Arizona